Joseph Karakis (or Iosif Karakys; ; 29 May 1902 – 23 February 1988) was a Ukrainian Soviet architect, urban planner, painter and teacher, and one of the most prolific Kyiv architects, designing many buildings that are now considered architectural landmarks. More than two-thousand schools were built in the Soviet Union from designs created by Karakis, and overall there were more than four thousand buildings built from his designs.

Biography
Joseph Karakis was born on 29 May 1902 in the town of Balta, Ukraine, to Julius Borisovich Karakis (1879–1943), co-owner and a worker of a sugar factory in Turbin and Karakis (maiden name Geybtman) Frida Jakovlevna (1882–1968). Joseph was the oldest child and had a younger brother David Julevich Karakis (1904–1970) who has chosen to become a doctor, and was a colonel and chief of medical squadron during World War II.

From 1909 till 1917 Joseph Karakis studied at Vinnytsia realschule, while attending evening drawing classes of Abraham Cherkassky. In 1918, he worked as a painter decorator in Vinnytsia theater at Matthew Drak for the troupe of Hnat Yura, Amvrosy Buchma and Marian Krushelnitskiy. In 1919 he joined the Red Army as a volunteer, where he served as an artist for the agitation train. Since 1921 he worked as an artist for the Vinnytsia Commission on Monuments and art of antiquity. He was responsible for the formation of the city museum's gallery and library from the collection of Princess Branitskaya's mansion in Nemyriv.

In 1922 he was admitted to the Institute of National Economy at the Faculty of Law. A year later he got admitted to Kyiv Art Institute in the Faculty of Painting. During his studies he works as a theatre artist (during the years of 1925–1926 under the leadership of Nicholas Burachek). At the same time, in 1925, as a result of an influence by James Steinberg, he transitioned from a third year of having art major to a first year in an architectural department. In 1926, while studying, he worked as a senior technician in the construction of the Kiev railway station with his teacher Alexander Verbitsky, then assistant to the design as well as the implementation of the Academy of Sciences and first in Ukraine house for doctor's families located on Velyka Zhytomyrska str. 17 in Kyiv. In 1927, in a secret from their parents married Conservatory student of piano major Anna Kopman (1904–1993), who was considered one of the Kyiv beauties.

In 1929 he graduated with an architecture major. Architectural design was taught by P. Aleshin, A. Verbitsky and V. Rykov. In 1931 he received an invitation to teach at the Kyiv construction institute. Before the war, Karakis was an architect of various houses and public buildings, among which were the Jewish Theatre in Kyiv, the National Museum of Ukraine and others. Since 1941 he was an associate professor of architectural design at KARI. During the war years he worked on the contraction of the heavy machinery factories in Rostankoproekt (Rostov-on-Don and then in Tashkent). From 1942 to 1944 Karakis worked as a chief architect of the Farkhad Dam, where he has designed the dam, diversion channels, machinery room as well as various housing projects.
After the war he worked in the Kiev Giprograde and Civil Engineering Institute, and from 1948, was chief of the institute of the art industry of USSR Academy of Architecture.

In 1951, after another ideological "cleansing", he was fired. He was the only person who championed the preservation of historical monuments during the period of "struggle with cosmopolitanism."

Since 1952 Karakis worked in the Giprograd on the model design. From 1963 till 1976 he was head of the Design department at the Architecture School in KievZNIIEP. In 1977, following the invitation of B. E. Yasievich (1929–1992), he joined for some time the Kyiv Research Institute of History, Theory and prospective problems of Soviet architecture. There Karakis worked on development of the "Housing of the Near Future" prospect for building in Kyiv.

Karakis died on 23 February 1988. He was buried at Baikove Cemetery beside his mother.

Projects

In Kyiv:

 The Art School. (currently National Historical Museum of Ukraine) (1938)
 House of the Officers – Str. Grushevskogo, 30/1 (now it hosts the Central Museum of Armed Forces of Ukraine)
 The stairs and retaining wall with lanterns at the entrance to the site of the National Museum of History of Ukraine from the Vladimir street.
 "Model" school 29 (Co-authored with Voloshinov, G. and P. Aleshin, P; 1929)
 Residential house in Holosievo Forestry Institute (1931)
 House of the Red Army and Navy in Kyiv (1932)
 Reconstruction of the club in Avia-gorod (1933–1934)
 Restaurant "Dynamo", next to the Dynamo stadium (1932–1934)
 Music School and Concert Hall of the Conservatory of Music Alley (1936–1937)
 Reconstruction of the Theatre of the Red Army on the street. Meringovskoy (1938)
 Jewish theatre on Khreshchatyk str. 17 (1939)
 10-storey residential house in the style of constructivism in the street. Mazeppa (January Uprising). (1934–37)
 Residential building on the January Uprising str. 3 (1934–1936)
 Government Area (1935–1936)
 Residential house on the street. 25 October street (now called Institutskaya No. 15-17) (1935–1937)
 Dwelling house quo St George st. (1937)
 Residential house for senior officers on the Zolotovorotskaya street (1936)
 River Station in Kyiv in co-authorship with N. Holostenko. (1940)
 Residential house at Striletska street, 12 (1939–1940)
 The residential complex of the State Planning Commission on a street. 25 October (1938–1941)
 The second phase of the quarter on the January Uprising str., 5 (1939–1940)
 Houses of the pilot plant on the street. German and st. Laboratory (1939–1940)
 Dwelling house gallery type (1940–1941, 1949) – In the house for workers of the Kyiv shoe factory number 4 has been implemented completely atypical for Kiev gallery-system, typical of southern regions. Staircases are located on both sides of the body, the passage to the apartments through the open gallery. This design save 15% of funds in the construction of the building. Before the war, was built in draft form, later renovated and decorated. Includes 1-2-room apartments
 Gallery type houses with 50 apartments on Vyshgorod and Nekrasov streets (1939–1941)
 Building on Kreschatyk, 29 (destroyed in the explosion Kreschatyk) (1939–1941)
 Machining shop pilot plant (1940)
 Experimental School in the boulevard of Peoples' Friendship No. 12 (1958)
 Model School (1953–1955)
 Experimental School No.80 (in front of the school there was a square with a fountain). (1960)

In the city Begovat (Central Asia):
 Farkhad Dam: dam, machine room, the diversion canal (2 km. long) and aqueduct for the Farkhad Dam (1942–1944);
 Housing estates Farhadskaya GES 1000 and 500 (1943–1945);
 Detached house for the construction of hydroelectric Farhadskaya (1943).
 In years, Kryvyi Rih, Vinnitsa, etc.:
 Cinema at the 1000 spectators (1934–1935).

In the city of Kryvyi Rih:
 Sotsgorod (1933–1936).

In the city of Kharkov:
 House of the Red Army and Navy (1934);
 House Co-operative societies (in collaboration with VI Zabolotny and P. Yurchenko) [draft] (1940)
 School on the street. Louis Pasteur (awarded first prize contest for the best building) (1954).

In the city Skhomorohi (now Ozernoe):
 House of the Red Army (1933–1934).

In the city of Komsomolsk:
 Music School.

In the city of Kramatorsk:
 Palace of Culture im.Stalina (Co-authored with L. Yurovsky) [draft] (1940)

In the city of Lugansk:
 Hotel "October" (now called "Ukraine") (built in 1947–1952).

In the city of Moscow:
 Kursk Station. (Co-authored with L. Yurchenko and S. Tatarenko Award) [draft] (1932)

In the city Voroshilovgrad:
 School;
 Museum of the Revolution [project] (1940).

In the city of Tashkent:
 Abrasive Works (1942);
 School No. 110 named after Shevchenko for 2600 students in the "Ukrainian" district of the city (1969).

In the city of Chisinau:
 Monument Kotovsk (in collaboration with the sculptor LD Muravina), custom competition (1947).

In the city of Kramatorsk:
 Experimental School (1962).

In addition:
 Pilot schools for children who recover from cerebral palsy in Odessa and Berdyansk (1963);
 Experimental school for mentally retarded children in Zaporizhzhya (1964);
 School of square classes in Kramatorsk (1965);
 Consolidated school building (pavilion type) for 2,032 students in Donetsk on the Kalmius river  (1965)
 Pilot school buildings large capacity in Makhachkala, Baku, Voroshilovgrad, Dnipridzerzhinsk (1966–1969);
 School in Komsomolsk;
 From 1953 to 1975 was developed jointly with a team of employees over 40 model projects of different capacities of secondary schools, boarding schools and music which has built more than four thousand buildings in Ukraine, schools, and other republics of the RSFSR (1954-198?).

Selected publications 
 In Ukrainian : "Яким повинно бути житло // Більшовик. — 1936. — 5 серпня. — № 181"
 In Ukrainian : "Про план житлового осередку // Соціалістичний Київ. — 1936. — № 6 (співавтор І. Дубов)"
 In Ukrainian : "Школи художнього виховання // Соціалістичний Київ. — 1937. — № 2"
 In Ukrainian : "Жилий квартал над Дніпром // Соціалістичний Київ. — 1937. — № 4
 In Ukrainian : "Будівництво і проектування сільських шкіл на Україні // Радянська школа. — 1938. — № 4
 In Ukrainian : "Колгоспний клуб // Архітектура Радянської України. — 1941. — № 6"
 In Ukrainian : "Москва радянська // Вісник Академії архітектури УРСР. — 1947. — № 2"
 In Ukrainian : "Нова, незвична… // Київський будівельник—1960. — 16 червня. — № 24"
 In Russian: "За комплексную застройку // Архитектурная газета. — 1936. — 8 июня. — № 32"
 In Russian: "Жилой дом на Украине // Архитектурная газета — 1937. — 18 апреля. — № 22
 In Russian: "Архитектура жилья на Украине: 20 лет Великой Социалистической революции // Архитектурная газета. — 1937. — 8 октября. — № 69
 In Russian: "Экспериментальное проектирование жилых микрорайонов // Вестник ГИПРОГРАДа. — К., 1946"
 In Russian: "Хозяйственные сооружения в системе двухэтажной жилой застройки // Техническая информация / ГИПРОГРАД. — К., 1952. — № 3"
 In Russian: "Здание гостиницы в г. Ворошиловграде // Техническая информация / ГИПРОГРАД. — К., 1952. — № 14"
 In Russian: "Экспериментальный проект жилого дома галерейного типа на 72 квартиры // Техническая информация / ГИПРОГРАД. — К., 1956. — № 1"
 In Russian: "Галерейные жилые дома // Архитектура СССР. — 1957. — № 4"
 In Russian: "Типовое проектирование школ-интернатов // Строительство и архитектура. — 1957. — № 3; Будівництво і архітектура. — 1957. — № 3"
 In Russian: "К вопросу проектирования новых типов школьных зданий (Из опыта типового проектирования ГИПРОГРАДа) // Проектирование и строительство школьных зданий. — К., 1958."
 In Russian: "Средняя школа на 400 учащихся: Некоторые конструктивные и планировочные особенности школьных зданий, проектируемых из крупных стеновых блоков // Проектирование и строительство школьных зданий. — К., 1958"
 In Russian: "Однокомнатные квартиры в галерейном доме // Строительство и архитектура. — 1958. — № 1; Будівництво і архітектура. — 1958. — № 1 (соавтор Х. Заривайская)"
 In Russian: "Типовой проект семилетней музыкальной школы на 200—300 учащихся // Техническая информация / ГИПРОГРАД. — К., 1958. — № 7 (134)"
 In Russian: "Пути улучшения экономических и бытовых качеств жилья // Техническая информация / ГИПРОГРАД. — К., 1958. — № 8-9 (135—136)"
 In Russian: "Новые типовые проекты // Техническая информация / ГИПРОГРАД. — К., 1958. — № 10"
 In Russian: "Жилые дома галерейного типа для строительства в VII и VIII пятилетках // Техническая информация / ГИПРОГРАД — К., 1958 — № 10"
 In Russian: "Типовой проект семилетней музыкальной школы на 200—300 учащихся // Техническая информация / ГИПРОГРАД — К., 1958. — № 7"
 In Russian: "Новые типовые проекты: О домах галерейного типа // Жилищное строительство. — 1958. — № 11"
 In Russian: "Пути улучшения планировки жилья // Строительство и архитектура. — 1959. — № 1; Будівництво і архітектура. — 1959. — № 1"
 In Russian: "Жилой корпус на 600 воспитанников [школы-интерната] в Киеве // Строительство и архитектура. — 1959. — № 2 (соавторы Н.Савченко, А.Волненко)"
 In Russian: "Номенклатура домов галерейного типа для строительства в Украинской ССР // Жилищное строительство. — 1959. — № 2"
 In Russian: "От эксперимента — к массовому строительству: Комплексная серия типовых проектов школ и школ-интернатов // Строительство и архитектура. — 1960. — № 11 (соавтор В. Городской)"
 In Russian: "Экспериментальная школа в Киеве // Жилищное строительство — 1961 — № 4"
 In Russian: "Кооперирование и размещение школ и школьных городков в современной жилой застройке // Архитектура учебно-воспитательных зданий в жилой застройке. — М., 1976"
 In Russian: "Жилище ближайшего будущего (Научно-творческое поисковое исследование): Отчет о НИР / Киевский научно-исследовательский институт теории, истории и перспективных проблем советской архитектуры (ныне — НИИТИАГ). Инв. № 1071. — К., 1977. — 29 с."
 and more.

Students

Various people consider themselves to be students of Karakis. Most of them studied and worked with the architect during the period of 1933 to 1952. Several, later became famous Soviet and Ukrainian architects. among those people are: Anatoly Dobrovolsky, Abraham Moiseevich Miletsky, Yuri Aseev, Valentin Ezhov, Vadim Skugarev, Boris Zhezherin, Anatoly Ignaschenko, Viktor Chepelyk, Zoya V. Moiseenko, Boris M. Davidson (Karakis helped him to defend his doctoral architectural thesis), Yuriy Khimich and more. 

Some of his students later became writers, among them Viktor Nekrasov and Leonid Serpilin. Karakis's student, Volodymyr Dakhno, became an animation film director.  

One of Joseph Karakis's students was his daughter Irma Karakis, who later earned a Ph.D. in architecture and became a senior researcher. Irma Karakis worked as head of an interior sector of KievZNIIEP.

In memory

During the 100 years celebration (in the year 2002), the following items were released:
 Calling cards with a portrait and works of Karakis (Five different designs with different nominal value)
 A detailed colour catalogue (over 100-page log) with some of the most important works of the architect
 Memorial posters were published in the bus stations throughout the city
 A web portal created by ministry of culture with author's works
 An exhibition of works of the architect was held

Notes

External links

 
   On 29 May at the National Academy of Fine Arts there was a celebration and gallery exhibition dedicated to the 100 anniversary of the prominent architect Joseph Yul'evich Karakis.

References 

 Berkovich, Gary. Reclaiming a History. Jewish Architects in Imperial Russia and the USSR. Volume 3. Socialist Realism: 1933–1955. Weimar und Rostock: Grunberg Verlag. 2022. P. 39. .

1902 births
1988 deaths
People from Balta, Ukraine
People from Baltsky Uyezd
Soviet people of Jewish descent
Soviet architects
Art Nouveau architects
Soviet urban planners
20th-century Ukrainian architects
Soviet military personnel of the Russian Civil War
Soviet military personnel of World War II
Burials at Baikove Cemetery